Grand Canyon Caverns Airport  is a public-use airport located  east of the central business district of Peach Springs, in Coconino County, Arizona, United States. The airport is privately owned by Grand Canyon Caverns & Inn, LLC.

Facilities 

 5/23 measuring 5,100 x 45 ft (1,554 x 14 m)

See also

 Grand Canyon Caverns
 List of airports in Arizona

References

External links 
 Grand Canyon Caverns Airport (L37) at Arizona DOT airport directory

Airports in Mohave County, Arizona